Dimock Township is a township in Susquehanna County, Pennsylvania, United States. The population was 1,232 at the 2020 census. It is the home of former U.S. Congressman Chris Carney, a Democrat who represented Pennsylvania's 10th congressional district from 2007 to 2011. The school building for the Elk Lake School District is located near the village of Elk Lake in the township.

Dimock was the site of a much publicized incident of water contamination from hydraulic fracturing, a process used to extract natural gas from the Marcellus Formation. In May 2012, after the installation of water treatment systems in affected homes, methane and arsenic were found only in small amounts at one home. At that time the EPA reported that their most recent "set of sampling did not show levels of contaminants that would give EPA reason to take further action." As of 2012, natural gas companies have been permitted to resume hydraulic fracturing in the area. The EPA and various universities continue to monitor water quality.

History
Named after Elder Davis Dimock, Dimock Township was formed from parts of Springville and Bridgewater Townships in December 1832.

Geography

Demographics

As of the census of 2000, there were 1,497 people, 570 households, and 425 families residing in the township.  The population density was 51.6 people per square mile (19.9/km2).  There were 723 housing units at an average density of 24.9/sq mi (9.7/km2).  The racial makeup of the township was 97.3% White, 0.1% African American, 0.05% American Indian, 0.05% Asian, 0.1% Pacific Islander, 1.3% from other races, and 1% from two or more races. Hispanic or Latino of any race were 2% of the population.

There were 570 households, out of which 33.9% had children under the age of 18 living with them, 60.2% were married couples living together, 8.4% had a female householder with no husband present, and 25.4% were non-families. 20.7% of all households were made up of individuals, and 9.2% had someone living alone who was 65 years of age or older.  The average household size was 2.63 and the average family size was 3.00.

In the township the population was spread out, with 24.9% under the age of 18, 60.9% from 18 to 64, and 14.2% who were 65 years of age or older.  The median age was 42.5 years.

The median income for a household in the township was $47,159, and the median income for a family was $55,139. Males had a median income of $40,924 versus $23,958 for females. The per capita income for the township was $22,648.  About 7.3% of families and 8.7% of the population were below the poverty line, including 5.9% of those under age 18 and 12.2% of those age 65 or over.

Water contamination incident

Dimock was the site of a much publicized water contamination from hydraulic fracturing, which was shown in the 2010 documentary Gasland. In 2009, 13 water wells in Dimock, Pennsylvania were contaminated with methane, and one exploded. Arsenic, barium, DEHP, glycol compounds, manganese, phenol, and sodium were found in unacceptable levels in the wells. As a result, Cabot Oil & Gas was required to financially compensate residents and provide alternative sources of water until mitigation systems were installed in affected wells. The company continues to deny that hydraulic fracturing was involved. In May 2012, after the installation of water treatment systems in affected homes, EPA reported that their most recent "set of sampling did not show levels of contaminants that would give EPA reason to take further action." Methane and arsenic were found only in one well. Cabot has held that the methane was preexisting, but state regulators have cited chemical fingerprinting as proof that it was from Cabot's hydraulic fracturing activities. Both Duke University and University of Rochester are conducting studies of the age of the well water to confirm the sources of the various contaminants. EPA plans to re-sample four wells where previous data by the company and the state showed levels of contaminants.

References

Townships in Susquehanna County, Pennsylvania
Populated places established in 1796
Townships in Pennsylvania
1796 establishments in Pennsylvania